The State Public Libraries (BPE) in Spain are a group of 53 public libraries owned by the Spanish Ministry of Culture's General Sub-Directorate for the Coordination of Libraries.

Libraries

References 

Public libraries
Libraries in Spain
Spanish culture